The Montego 25 is an American trailerable sailboat that was designed by Johannes "Jopie" Helsen as a racer-cruiser and first built in 1980.

Production
The design was built by Universal Marine in St. Petersburg, Florida, United States from 1980 until 1985, with 80 boats completed, but it is now out of production.

Design
The Montego 25 is a recreational keelboat, built predominantly of fiberglass, with wood trim. It has a masthead sloop rig, a raked stem, a plumb transom, a transom-hung rudder controlled by a tiller and a fin keel or optional shoal draft keel. It displaces  and carries  of iron ballast.

The boat is normally fitted with a small  outboard motor for docking and maneuvering, although a Japanese Yanmar 1GM inboard diesel engine was a factory option.

The design has sleeping accommodation for four people, with a double "V"-berth in the bow cabin and two straight settee berths in the main cabin. The galley is located on both sides, at the companionway. The galley is equipped with a two-burner stove to port and sink and icebox to starboard. The head is located just aft of the bow cabin.

Operational history
In a 2010 review Steve Henkel wrote, "designer Jopie Helsen owned a marina in St. Petersburg, FL, and designed boats on the side. This one may have been his best effort. She has a high Motion Index, good space down below, is relatively easy to singlehand, and properly sailed will give good performance on the race course. Best features: We used to race against a Montego 25 in our Morgan 24/25 ... and although we won the season trophy once or twice based on the average of our scores, we were never able to beat the Montego, either boat for boat or on corrected time. She is fast, we observed, both light and heavy air, And despite having the most headroom among her comps, she manages to avoid having a top-heavy look on the water. A wide companionway hatch and opening ports keep her cabin light and airy. She was available with either a shoal (3' 6") draft or deep fin (4' 6"). Sailing performance is distinctly better with the deep keel option. Worst features: No significant faults observed."

See also
List of sailing boat types

References

Keelboats
1980s sailboat type designs
Sailing yachts
Trailer sailers
Sailboat type designs by Johannes "Jopie" Helsen
Sailboat types built by Universal Marine